Lino Farisato (born 15 March 1945) is an Italian racing cyclist. He won stage 13 of the 1968 Giro d'Italia and stage 19 of the 1971 Giro d'Italia.

References

External links
 

1945 births
Living people
Italian male cyclists
Italian Giro d'Italia stage winners
Place of birth missing (living people)
Cyclists from the Province of Vicenza